Henry John Hill (7 July 1878 – 30 October 1906) was an Australian cricketer.

Hill was born in Adelaide, South Australia and was the brother of Australia captain Clem. He was a right-handed batsman and right-arm bowler of unknown style.

Hill played one first-class match for South Australia, a 1904 match against the strong touring England ("M.C.C.") team, making just 10 runs in his only innings, but taking 3 wickets for 45 runs, for an average of 15.00.  He died in Kensington Park, Adelaide.

References

External links
 Wisden obituary

1878 births
1906 deaths
Australian cricketers
South Australia cricketers
Cricketers from Adelaide